Agron Preteni (born 1990 in Split) is a Croatian  Cruiserweight kickboxer.

Biography and career
Preteni is the best fighter in junior category in his Pit Bull gym but also in Croatia. He has won many international titles, in 2006 Agron was 3rd on W.A.K.O. Kickboxing world championship, low-kick rules in Zadar, Croatia, In 2007 W.A.K.O. European kickboxing champion in Portugal, then in 2008 W.A.K.O. world champion on world championship in Naples and in the same year 5th on world championship in boxing held in Mexico City, where according to many people he was better fighter, and undeservedly lost in quarter finals. 18 years old Agron also became world champion in savate held in Novi Sad, Serbia as super heavyweight, knocking out Serbian fighter Ivo Debelić in the finals as he was standing 2.03 m tall and 110 kg heavy.

He was also successful as professional and senior amateur kickboxer. In 2010 he became K-1 Collizion Croatia champion, defeating much more experienced James Phillips in the finals. On the same year he participated W.A.K.O. senior European championship held in Loutraki, Greece, winning bronze medal.

In 2011 he went to Dakar to fight Boubacar N'Diaye for W.F.K.B. K-1 rules world title. He won the title in round 2 due to injury, leg of Boubacar was broken while Agron blocked a kick. Both bones below the knee, fibula and tibia were broken.

Preteni won silver medal on W.A.K.O. European Championships in -91 kg category held in Ankara, Turkey on November 2, 2012. He won silver medal beating one of the best Russian fighter Alexey Papin in the semi finals, then went to the finals with influenza and lost to best Serbian fighter and numerous W.A.K.O. champion Nenad Pagonis via unanimous decision.

He defeated Andrei Stoica via unanimous decision in a non-tournament bout at the K-1 World Grand Prix 2012 Final in Zagreb, Croatia on March 15, 2013. The fight was all Stoica, until Preteni dropped him with a left hook early in the second round which earned an eight count and really turned the tide of the fight. Mladen Krajnčec, one of the judges said that this was hardest fight to judge and that K-1 rules clearly state that the one who is in a knockdown loses the fight.

It was announced that Preteni will fight on March 23, 2013 at the Obračun u Ringu 11 event versus Zeki Tezer if he rehabilitates minor shoulder injuries suffered in fight against Andrei Stoica. If not he would be replaced by Toni Čatipović. However Preteni could not fight and as announced was replaced by teammate Čatipović. At the end of the fight Preteni gave him the winning trophy. He was also scheduled to fight Mamadou Keta at Final Fight 3: Jurković vs. Cătinaș in Split, Croatia on April 19, 2013 but because of same injury he had to cancel the fight.

It was a replay of last years European championship as Preteni won silver medal on W.A.K.O. World Championships in -91 kg category also losing to Nenad Pagonis by unanimous decision.

He rematched Andrei Stoica at Legend 2: Invasion in Moscow, Russia on November 9, 2013 in a reserve bout of Legend Fighting Show -95 kg tournament. Preteni took a majority judges decision in a close fight with many strong kicks and punches which did little damage. As Zabit Samedov got injured Preteni advanced to the final where he faced veteran of the sport Pavel Zhuravlev. First round was equal but at the beginning of second Zhuravlev showed what's he made of and after two knockdowns gain TKO victory, title and cheque of $100,000.

He was expected to face Luis Tavares for vacant International Kickboxing Association K1 rules heavyweight world championship at Kickboxing Elite promotion event in Las Vegas, Nevada on March 8, 2014. However Preteni was replaced with Hicham Achalhi because he couldn't get work permit.

Titles

Professional
 2016 W5 European Champion -86 kg
 2013 Legend Fighting Show -95 kg Tournament Runner-up
 2011 W.F.K.B. World K-1 Rules Champion −95 kg 
 2010 K-1 Collizion Croatia Champion

Amateur
2013 - W.A.K.O. World Championships in Guaruja, Brasil  −91 kg (Low-Kick rules)
2012 - W.A.K.O. European Championships in Ankara, Turkey  −91 kg (Low-Kick rules)
2010 - W.A.K.O. European Championships in Loutraki, Greece  −91 kg (Full contact rules)
2009 - World junior savate championship in Novi Sad, Serbia 
2008 – 5th place on a World Junior Championship of Boxing AIBA in Mexico City
2008 – W.A.K.O. World Junior Championship in Naples, Italy  -86 kg (Low-Kick rules)
2007 - W.A.K.O. European Junior Championship in Faro, Portugal  -81 kg (Low-Kick rules)
2006 – W.A.K.O. World Junior Championship in Zadar, Croatia  (Low-Kick rules),

Kickboxing record

|-
|-  bgcolor="#FFBBBB"
| 2017-04-29 || Loss  ||align=left| Yousri Belgaroui || Glory 40: Copenhagen, Semi Final ||Copenhagen, Denmark || Decision (unanimous)  || 3 || 3:00 
|- 
|-  bgcolor="#CCFFCC"
| 2017-02-26 || Win ||align=left| Muhamed Mahmić || Noć Gladijatora ||Čapljina, BIH || TKO (Low kicks) || 1 || 
|- 
|-  bgcolor="#FFBBBB"
| 2016-12-03 || Loss ||align=left| Timur Aylyarov || K-1 WGP Euro 2016 -85kg Championship Tournament, Semi Final ||Tuzla, BIH || Decision (Unanimous) || 3 || 3:00
|- 
|-  bgcolor="#CCFFCC"
| 2016-12-03 || Win ||align=left| Imanol Rodríguez ||K-1 WGP Euro 2016 -85kg Championship Tournament, Quarter Final|| Tuzla, BIH || Decision (Unanimous) || 3 || 3:00
|-
|-  bgcolor="#CCFFCC"
| 2016-06-04 || Win ||align=left| Bogdan Năstase ||W5 European League XXXIV|| Zagreb, Croatia || Decision (unanimous) || 5 || 3:00
|-
! style=background:white colspan=9 |
|-
|-  bgcolor="#CCFFCC"
| 2016-05-21 || Win ||align=left| Labinot Zekaj ||It's W5 Time XXXIII|| Vienna, Austria || KO || 2 || 
|-
|-  bgcolor="#CCFFCC"
| 2015-06-24 || Win ||align=left| Mitar Nikolov ||Obračun u Podstrani VI || Podstrana, Croatia || TKO (low kick) || 2 || 
|-
|-  bgcolor="#c5d2ea"
| 2015-05-30 || Draw ||align=left| Denis Marjanović ||Obračun u Ringu 13 || Split, Croatia || Draw || 3 || 3:00
|-
! style=background:white colspan=9 |
|-
|-  bgcolor="#FFBBBB"
| 2014-12-18 || Loss ||align=left| Nenad Pagonis  || SOUL Night of Champions  || Novi Sad, Serbia || Decision (unanimous) || 5 || 3:00
|-
! style=background:white colspan=9 |
|-
|-  bgcolor="#FFBBBB"
| 2013-11-08 || Loss ||align=left| Pavel Zhuravlev || Legend 2: Invasion, Final || Moscow, Russia || TKO (left hook) || 2 || 0:46
|- 
! style=background:white colspan=9 |
|-
|-  bgcolor="#CCFFCC"
| 2013-11-08 || Win ||align=left| Andrei Stoica || Legend 2: Invasion, Reserve bout || Moscow, Russia || Decision (Majority) || 3 || 3:00 
|- 
|-  bgcolor="#CCFFCC"
| 2013-03-15 || Win ||align=left| Andrei Stoica || K-1 World Grand Prix 2012 Final, Super Fight || Zagreb, Croatia ||Decision (Unanimous) || 3|| 3:00
|-  bgcolor="#CCFFCC"
| 2012-03-10 || Win ||align=left| Pacome Assi || Cro Cop Final Fight || Zagreb, Croatia || Decision (Majority) || 3 || 3:00
|-  bgcolor="#CCFFCC"
| 2011-10-22 || Win ||align=left| Boubacar N'Diaye || Championnat D'Afrique Pro || Dakar, Senegal || TKO (Broken leg) || 2 ||
|-
! style=background:white colspan=9 |
|-
|-  bgcolor="#CCFFCC"
| 2011-04-30 || Win ||align=left| Umberto Lucci ||  || Milan, Italy || KO (Left high kick) || 2 || 
|-
|-  bgcolor="#CCFFCC"
| 2011-04-10 || Win ||align=left| Fabia Giannasio ||  || Santeramo in Colle, Italia || Decision || 3 || 3:00
|-  bgcolor="#FFBBBB"
| 2011-02-05 || Loss ||align=left| Yuksel Ayaydin || Fight Code: Rhinos Series, Final 16 (Part 1) || Nitra, Slovakia || Decision || 3 || 3:00
|-  bgcolor="#CCFFCC"
| 2010-07-09 || Win ||align=left| Franci Grajš || Mega Fight || Umag, Croatia || Decision || 3 || 3:00
|-  bgcolor="#CCFFCC"
| 2010-12-17 || Win ||align=left| Jovan Kaluđerović || Splendid Grand Prix 2010 || Budva, Montenegro || Decision || 3 || 3:00
|-  bgcolor="#CCFFCC"
| 2010–06-04 || Win ||align=left| Pacome Assi || Nitrianska Noc Bojovnikov - Ring of Honor  || Nitra, Slovakia || Decision (Unanimous) || 3 || 3:00
|- bgcolor="#CCFFCC"
| 2010-03-27 || Win ||align=left| James Phillips  || Obračun u ringu 10, final || Split, Croatia || Decision (Unanimous) || 3 || 3:00
|-
! style=background:white colspan=9 |
|-
|- bgcolor="#CCFFCC"
| 2010-03-27 || Win ||align=left| Henry Bannert  || Obračun u ringu 10, quarter finals || Split, Croatia || KO || 2 || 1:32
|-  bgcolor="#CCFFCC"
| 2009-08-07 || Win ||align=left| Gian Marco Zarolli || Oluja u ringu III || Hvar, Croatia || Decision (unanimous) || 3 || 3:00
|-  bgcolor="#CCFFCC"
| 2009-05-26 || Win ||align=left| Muamer Tufekčić || Konačni Obračun  || Podgorica, Montenegro || Decision (unanimous) || 3 || 2:00
|-  bgcolor="#CCFFCC"
| 2009-03-22 || Win ||align=left| Toni Milanović || Obračun u ringu 9 || Split, Croatia || Decision (unanimous) || 3 || 3:00
|-  bgcolor="#CCFFCC"
| 2008-05-11 || Win ||align=left| Josip Semren || Obračun u Ringu 8 || Zadar, Croatia || KO || 1||
|-
! style=background:white colspan=9 |
|-

|-
|-  bgcolor="#FFBBBB"
| 2013-10-04 || Loss ||align=left| Nenad Pagonis || W.A.K.O World Championships 2013, Low-Kick Final -91 kg  || Guaruja, Brasil || Decision (Unanimous) || 3 || 2:00
|-
! style=background:white colspan=9 |
|-
|-  bgcolor="#CCFFCC"
| 2013-10-03 || Win ||align=left| Zakhar Vorobey || W.A.K.O World Championships 2013, Low-Kick Semi Finals -91 kg  || Guaruja, Brasil || Decision (Unanimous) || 3 || 2:00
|-  bgcolor="#CCFFCC"
| 2013-10-03 || Win ||align=left| Zurab Besiashvili || W.A.K.O World Championships 2013, Low-Kick Quarter Finals -91 kg || Guaruja, Brasil || Decision (Unanimous) || 3 || 2:00
|-  bgcolor="#FFBBBB"
| 2012-11-02 || Loss ||align=left| Nenad Pagonis || W.A.K.O European Championships 2012, Low-Kick Final -91 kg || Ankara, Turkey || Decision (Unanimous) || 3 || 2:00
|-
! style=background:white colspan=9 |
|-
|-  bgcolor="#CCFFCC"
| 2012-11-01 || Win ||align=left| Alexei Papin || W.A.K.O European Championships 2012, Low-Kick Semi Finals -91 kg  || Ankara, Turkey || Decision (unanimous) || 3 || 2:00
|-  bgcolor="#CCFFCC"
| 2012-10-31 || Win ||align=left| Dănuț Hurduc || W.A.K.O European Championships 2012, Low-Kick Quarter Finals -91 kg  || Ankara, Turkey || Decision (unanimous) || 3 || 2:00
|-  bgcolor="#FFBBBB"
| 2010-11-25 || Loss ||align=left| Denis Simkin || W.A.K.O European Championships 2010, Full contact Semi Finals -91 kg || Loutraki, Greece || Decision (Split) || 3 || 2:00
|-
! style=background:white colspan=9 |
|-
|-  bgcolor="#CCFFCC"
| 2010-11-24 || Win ||align=left| Tomasz Duszak || W.A.K.O European Championships 2010, Full contact Quarter Finals -91 kg || Loutraki, Greece || Decision (Unanimous) || 3 || 2:00
|-  bgcolor="#CCFFCC"
| 2010-11-22 || Win ||align=left| Umberto Lucci || W.A.K.O European Championships 2010, Full contact First Round -91 kg || Loutraki, Greece || Decision (Unanimous) || 3 || 2:00
|-  bgcolor="#CCFFCC"
| 2008-09 || Win ||align=left| Toni Milanović || W.A.K.O Junior World Championships 2008, Low-kick Final -86 kg || Naples, Italy || Decision (Unanimous) || 3 || 2:00
|-
! style=background:white colspan=9 |
|-
|-  bgcolor="#CCFFCC"
| 2008-09 || Win ||align=left| Diyar Seitov || W.A.K.O Junior World Championships 2008, Low-kick Semi Finals -86 kg || Naples, Italy || Decision (Unanimous) || 3 || 2:00
|-
|-  bgcolor="#CCFFCC"
| 2008-02-02 || Win ||align=left| Josip Semern || Croatian Junior Kickboxing Championship, K-1 Final -86 kg || Imotski, Croatia ||  ||  || 
|-
! style=background:white colspan=9 |
|-
|-  bgcolor="#FFBBBB"
| 2008-03-22 || Loss ||align=left| Marin Roso || Croatian Kickboxing Championship, Full-contact Final -86 kg || Split, Croatia ||  ||  || 
|-
! style=background:white colspan=9 |
|-
|-  bgcolor="#CCFFCC"
| 2008-03-22 || Win ||align=left| Stipe Stipetić || Croatian Kickboxing Championship, Full-contact Semi Finals -86 kg || Split, Croatia ||  ||  || 
|-
|-  bgcolor="#CCFFCC"
| 2008-02-02 || Win ||align=left| Filip Zovko || Croatian Junior Kickboxing Championship, Low-kick Final -86 kg || Split, Croatia ||  ||  || 
|-
! style=background:white colspan=9 |
|-
|-  bgcolor="#CCFFCC"
| 2008-02-02 || Win ||align=left| Filip Perica || Croatian Junior Kickboxing Championship, Low-kick Semi Finals -86 kg || Split, Croatia ||  ||  || 
|-
|-  bgcolor="#CCFFCC"
| 2007-11 || Win ||align=left| Kurban Magamedov || W.A.K.O Junior European Championships 2007, Low-kick Final -81 kg || Faro, Portugal ||  ||  || 
|-
! style=background:white colspan=9 |
|-
|-  bgcolor="#CCFFCC"
| 2007-11 || Win ||align=left| Valter Monteiro || W.A.K.O Junior European Championships 2007, Low-kick Semi Finals -81 kg || Faro, Portugal ||  ||  || 
|-
|-  bgcolor="#FFBBBB"
| 2007-09-16 || Loss ||align=left| Almin Hopovac || Za Svjetlo, Low-kick -81 kg || Sukošan, Croatia || Decision (Split) || 3 || 2:00
|-
|-
| colspan=9 | Legend:

See also

List of WAKO Amateur World Championships
List of WAKO Amateur European Championships
List of K-1 champions
List of K-1 events
List of male kickboxers

References

External links
Profile at FightLife.ru
Official site of Pit Bull gym

1990 births
Living people
Croatian male kickboxers
Cruiserweight kickboxers
Croatian savateurs
Sportspeople from Split, Croatia
Croatian people of Albanian descent